China BlueChemical Limited or China BlueChemical is the largest nitrogenous fertilizer manufacturer in Mainland China by production volume and energy efficiency, engaging in processing of natural gas for production of chemical fertilizers and other chemical products. It is headquartered in Dongfang, Hainan. Its parent company is CNOOC, the third largest petroleum state-owned enterprise in Mainland China.

Its H shares were listed on the Hong Kong Stock Exchange on 29 September 2006.

External links
China BlueChemical Limited

Companies based in Hainan
Companies listed on the Hong Kong Stock Exchange
Fertilizer companies of China
H shares
China National Offshore Oil Corporation
Government-owned companies of China
Agriculture companies established in 2006
Chemical companies established in 2006
2006 establishments in China
Chinese brands